Early Morning Dream is a limited-edition book by Patti Smith, published sine nomine (without a name) in 1972. It was limited to 100 copies.

Notes

External links 
 

Poetry by Patti Smith
1972 books